"If That's Your Boyfriend (He Wasn't Last Night)" is a single by American recording artist Meshell Ndegeocello. It was released in 1993 on Maverick Records. It also appears on her debut album Plantation Lullabies that was released on October 19, 1993, on Maverick Records. The single reached number 73 on the US Billboard Hot 100, number 74 in the UK, and number 79 in Australia. Colin Larkin called it a "provocative post-feminist statement" in his Encyclopedia of Popular Music. The single earned Ndegeocello nominations for both Best R&B Song and Best Female R&B Vocal Performance at the 37th Grammy Awards.

The song was the basis of the Queen Pen song "Girlfriend" on her 1997 album My Melody.

Track listing
"If That's Your Boyfriend (He Wasn't Last Night)" (Album Version)
"If That's Your Boyfriend (He Wasn't Last Night)" (Mad Sex Mix Extended) (Lil Louis Remix)
"If That's Your Boyfriend (He Wasn't Last Night)" (The Gentrified 9 Mix) (David Gamson Remix)
"If That's Your Boyfriend (He Wasn't Last Night)" (Existential Meditation on the Probability of You Kissing My Mind) (A-Plus Remix)
"If That's Your Boyfriend (He Wasn't Last Night)" (Tiramisu Mix Extended) (Lil Louis Remix)
"If That's Your Boyfriend (He Wasn't Last Night)" (Lil Louis Freaky Mix)

Charts

References

1993 singles
1993 songs
Maverick Records singles
Meshell Ndegeocello songs
Songs about infidelity
Songs with feminist themes
Songs written by Meshell Ndegeocello